Characterization, when used in materials science, refers to the broad and general process by which a material's structure and properties are probed and measured. It is a fundamental process in the field of materials science, without which no scientific understanding of engineering materials could be ascertained. The scope of the term often differs; some definitions limit the term's use to techniques which study the microscopic structure and properties of materials, while others use the term to refer to any materials analysis process including macroscopic techniques such as mechanical testing, thermal analysis and density calculation. The scale of the structures observed in materials characterization ranges from angstroms, such as in the imaging of individual atoms and chemical bonds, up to centimeters, such as in the imaging of coarse grain structures in metals.

While many characterization techniques have been practiced for centuries, such as basic optical microscopy, new techniques and methodologies are constantly emerging. In particular the advent of the electron microscope and secondary ion mass spectrometry in the 20th century has revolutionized the field, allowing the imaging and analysis of structures and compositions on much smaller scales than was previously possible, leading to a huge increase in the level of understanding as to why different materials show different properties and behaviors. More recently, atomic force microscopy has further increased the maximum possible resolution for analysis of certain samples in the last 30 years.

Microscopy

Microscopy is a category of characterization techniques which probe and map the surface and sub-surface structure of a material. These techniques can use photons, electrons, ions or physical cantilever probes to gather data about a sample's structure on a range of length scales. Some common examples of microscopy techniques include:

Optical microscopy
Scanning electron microscopy (SEM)
Transmission electron microscopy (TEM)
Field ion microscopy (FIM)
Scanning probe microscopy (SPM)
Atomic force microscopy (AFM)
Scanning tunneling microscopy (STM)
X-ray diffraction topography (XRT)

Spectroscopy
Spectroscopy is a category of characterization techniques which use a range of principles to reveal the chemical composition, composition variation, crystal structure and photoelectric properties of materials. Some common examples of spectroscopy techniques include:

Optical radiation
Ultraviolet-visible spectroscopy (UV-vis)
Fourier transform infrared spectroscopy (FTIR)
Thermoluminescence (TL)
Photoluminescence (PL)

X-ray

X-ray diffraction (XRD)
Small-angle X-ray scattering (SAXS)
Energy-dispersive X-ray spectroscopy (EDX, EDS)
Wavelength dispersive X-ray spectroscopy (WDX, WDS)
Electron energy loss spectroscopy (EELS)
X-ray photoelectron spectroscopy (XPS)
Auger electron spectroscopy (AES)
X-ray photon correlation spectroscopy (XPCS)

Mass spectrometry

Modes of mass spectrometry:
Electron ionization (EI)
Thermal ionization mass spectrometry (TI-MS)
MALDI-TOF
Secondary ion mass spectrometry (SIMS)

Nuclear spectroscopy

Nuclear magnetic resonance spectroscopy (NMR) 
Mössbauer spectroscopy (MBS)
Perturbed angular correlation (PAC)

Other
Photon correlation spectroscopy/Dynamic light scattering (DLS)
Terahertz spectroscopy (THz)
Electron paramagnetic/spin resonance (EPR, ESR)
Small-angle neutron scattering (SANS)
Rutherford backscattering spectrometry (RBS)

Macroscopic testing
A huge range of techniques are used to characterize various macroscopic properties of materials, including:

Mechanical testing, including tensile, compressive, torsional, creep, fatigue, toughness and hardness testing
Differential thermal analysis (DTA)
Dielectric thermal analysis (DEA, DETA)
Thermogravimetric analysis (TGA)
Differential scanning calorimetry (DSC)
Impulse excitation technique (IET)
Ultrasound techniques, including resonant ultrasound spectroscopy and time domain ultrasonic testing methods

See also 
Analytical chemistry
Instrumental chemistry
Semiconductor characterization techniques
Wafer bond characterization
Polymer characterization
Lipid bilayer characterization
Lignin characterization
Characterization of nanoparticles
MEMS for in situ mechanical characterization

References

Materials science